Rentina may refer to the following places in Greece:

Rentina, Thessaloniki, a municipal unit in the Thessaloniki regional unit 
Rentina, Karditsa, a municipal unit in the Karditsa regional unit